Sobolewskia is a genus of flowering plants belonging to the family Brassicaceae.

Its native range is from Crimea, Turkey to the Caucasus.

The genus name of Sobolewskia is in honour of Gregor Federovitch Sobolewsky or (otherwise spelt) Gregoriy Federowich Sobolewski (1741–1807), a Russian military doctor, botanist and mycologist. He was also botanical garden director in Saint Petersburg and a professor of botany. 
It was first described and published in Fl. Taur.-Caucas. Vol.3 on page 421 in 1819.

Known species
According to Kew:
Sobolewskia caucasica 
Sobolewskia clavata 
Sobolewskia sibirica 
Sobolewskia truncata

References

Brassicaceae
Brassicaceae genera
Plants described in 1819
Flora of the Crimean Peninsula
Flora of the North Caucasus
Flora of the Transcaucasus